was a Japanese film actor. He appeared in more than 100 films from 1923 to 1961.

Career
Takagi joined the acting school at Nikkatsu in 1920 but made his mark first at Makino Film Productions as a samurai film action star known for his speed and ability to do stunts. He started his own company, Takagi Shinpei Productions, in 1927 and directed one of his own films. He later moved from one company to the next before settling down as a supporting actor in the postwar years. He is most known outside Japan for playing the bandit chief in Akira Kurosawa's Seven Samurai.

Filmography

References

External links
 
 
 Allcinema database entry 

1902 births
1967 deaths
Japanese male film actors
Actors from Nagano Prefecture
20th-century Japanese male actors